Gholam-hossein Ebrahimi Dinani (also Romanized as Gholām-hossein Ebrāhīmī Dīnānī; born on 26 December 1934 in Isfahan) is an Iranian philosopher. He is best known for his research and writings about illuminationism and Shahab al-Din Suhrawardi. The three-time winner of Book of the Year award in Iran, Dinani is a professor emeritus at the University of Tehran, and lectures at Tarbiat Modares University and Ferdowsi University of Mashhad. Moreover, his public lectures at Institute for Research in Philosophy attract a diverse audience from students and scholars of theology and philosophy in general.

One of the central themes in Dr. Dinani's writings is the belief that religious thought should completely accord with wisdom and reason. He has written over 40 books and hundreds of articles, in addition to many public lectures, encompassing diverse philosophical topics.

References
http://ias.ac.ir/index.php?option=com_content&view=category&layout=blog&id=90&Itemid=401&lang=en
http://ibna.ir/vdcc4iqs02bqie8.-ya2.html
https://archive.today/20130218080912/http://english.irib.ir/radioculture/iran/iranian-intellectuals/philosophers/item/77123-mirhashemi-to-direct-biopic-on-philosophy-scholar-ebrahimi-dinani
https://archive.today/20130415100207/http://iranreview.org/content/Documents/Hafez_National_Day.htm
http://iran-daily.com/1391/7/30/MainPaper/4360/Page/12/Index.htm#
https://web.archive.org/web/20120904045609/http://www.iranreview.org/content/Documents/Happy_Sadi_Day.htm
http://iran-daily.com/1391/7/30/MainPaper/4360/Page/12/MainPaper_4360_12.pdf
https://www.youtube.com/watch?v=iIlk6rB8EPE
https://www.youtube.com/watch?v=Aj8vHH0rMss
http://ibna.ir/getai0nm.49n6w1gtk4.html
http://shararehsalehi.com/images/artwork/portraits/Ebrahimi%20Dinani%20-Gholamhossin.jpg

1934 births
Living people
University of Tehran alumni
Academic staff of the University of Tehran
Islamic philosophers
Writers from Isfahan
20th-century Iranian philosophers
Iran's Book of the Year Awards recipients
Faculty of Letters and Humanities of the University of Tehran alumni
Academy of Sciences of Iran members